Senior Love Triangle is a 2019 romantic drama film directed by Kelly Blatz, in his feature film directorial debut.

Plot 
A polyamorous relationship unexpectedly happens between Adina, Jeanie, and 84-year-old WWII veteran William. Adina and Jeanie agree to this arrangement with William out of their love for him and because they do not want to be alone.

The events in the film are inspired by a true story and co-writer Isadora Kosofsky's long-term photo essay of the same name.

Cast 

Tom Bower as William Selig
 Marilyn Mason as Jeanie
 Anne Gee Byrd as Adina
 Travis Van Winkle as Spencer
 Matt Bush as Ignacio
 Carrie Gibson as Samantha
 Noah Weisberg as Thomas
 Michelle Bonilla as Julia
 Loren Lester as David
 Bryan Fisher as Jake
 Lee de Broux as Hank
 Michael Lanahan as U-Haul Employee
 Ricky Montez as Ricky
 Brandon Sutton as Security Guard
 Tyrone Evans Clark as Mental Ward Patient
 Robert Maffia as Ron
 Duane Taniguchi as Donut Shop Owner
 Nicole Starrett as Hospital Security
 Chantal Nchako as Instructor
 Allyson Reilly as Ice Cream Employee
 Al Troupe as Al Troupe
 Carlton Fluker as Doctor Hill
 R. Sky Palkowitz as Server
 Chris Yonan as Than

Production 
Kelly Blatz directed the film, with former NBA player Baron Davis being one of the executive producers.

Release 
The film was distributed by Gravitas Ventures with a runtime of 1 hour and 32 minutes. It became available on DVD in 2019, and was released on August 4, 2020, on VOD / Digital release.

Critical reception
The film has an approval rating of 100% based on 8 professional reviews on the review aggregator website Rotten Tomatoes.

Adaptation 
After the film was released in 2020, a book inspired by the film was created containing photos of elderly people practicing polyamory.

References

External links 
 

2019 directorial debut films
2019 films
2019 independent films
2019 romantic drama films
2010s American films
American independent films
American romantic drama films
Books based on films
Films about old age
Films scored by Nami Melumad
Polyamory in fiction
2019 drama films